The 1998–99 NBA season was the Grizzlies' fourth season in the National Basketball Association. On March 23, 1998, the owners of all 29 NBA teams voted 27–2 to reopen the league's collective bargaining agreement, seeking changes to the league's salary cap system, and a ceiling on individual player salaries. The National Basketball Players Association (NBPA) opposed to the owners' plan, and wanted raises for players who earned the league's minimum salary. After both sides failed to reach an agreement, the owners called for a lockout, which began on July 1, 1998, putting a hold on all team trades, free agent signings and training camp workouts, and cancelling many NBA regular season and preseason games. Due to the lockout, the NBA All-Star Game, which was scheduled to be played in Philadelphia on February 14, 1999, was also cancelled. However, on January 6, 1999, NBA commissioner David Stern, and NBPA director Billy Hunter finally reached an agreement to end the lockout. The deal was approved by both the players and owners, and was signed on January 20, ending the lockout after 204 days. The regular season began on February 5, and was cut short to just 50 games instead of the regular 82-game schedule.

The Grizzlies had the second overall pick in the 1998 NBA draft, which they used to select Mike Bibby from the University of Arizona, acquired rookie guard Felipe López from the San Antonio Spurs, and signed free agent Cherokee Parks during the off-season. The Grizzlies had a 4–6 record in their first ten games, but then struggled posting a 13-game losing streak between February and March, as Bryant Reeves only played just 25 games due to weight problems and a knee injury. Midway through the season, three-point specialist Sam Mack was traded back to his former team, the Houston Rockets in exchange for second-year guard Rodrick Rhodes. The Grizzlies lost their final seven games, returning to last place in the Midwest Division with a league worst record of 8–42.

Shareef Abdur-Rahim averaged 23.0 points, 7.5 rebounds and 1.4 steals per game, while Bibby averaged 13.2 points, 6.5 assists and 1.6 steals per game, and was named to the NBA All-Rookie First Team. In addition, Tony Massenburg provided the team with 11.2 points and 6.0 rebounds per game, while Reeves provided with 10.8 points and 5.5 rebounds per game, Lopez contributed 9.3 points per game, Parks averaged 5.5 points and 5.1 rebounds per game, and Michael Smith contributed 7.3 rebounds per game off the bench.

Following the season, Massenburg was traded to the Houston Rockets, and Smith, Rhodes, and Lee Mayberry were all traded to the Orlando Magic, who then released all three players to free agency, as Smith signed as a free agent with the Washington Wizards.

Draft picks
The Grizzlies' first draft pick was Mike Bibby, which was the second overall pick in the draft.

Roster

Roster Notes
 Rookie power forward J. R. Henderson holds Japanese and American dual citizenship. He was born in the United States, but played for the Japanese national team.

Regular season
Due to the 1998–99 NBA lockout, the NBA would see a shortened schedule for the 1998–99 season, as every team would play 50 games, compared to 82 in a normal season.  The Grizzlies began the season with their best start in franchise history, as they had a 3–3 record in their first six games, the latest in a season that the club had a .500 record.  Vancouver would fall into a bad streak, losing sixteen of their next seventeen games, which included a thirteen-game losing streak, to fall out of the playoff picture.  Wins would be few and far between for the remainder of the season, as the Grizzlies ended the year with a record of 8–42, which represented a .160 winning percentage, the lowest in team history.  Vancouver finished with the worst record in the league for the third time in four seasons.

Highs
 On February 16, 1999, Vancouver defeats the Los Angeles Clippers 93–89 in double overtime, to even their record to 3-3, the latest they had ever been .500 in a season. This would be their only road win of the season.
 On February 23, 1999, Shareef Abdur-Rahim leads the Grizzlies with 28 points, as they stun the Los Angeles Lakers with a 93–83 victory, recording their first ever victory against the Lakers.

Lows
 On February 21, 1999, the Grizzlies lose to their expansion cousins, the Toronto Raptors 102–87 in the first game played at the Raptors' new arena, the Air Canada Centre.
 On March 16, 1999, Vancouver loses 87–85 to the Seattle SuperSonics, extending their losing streak to a season high thirteen games.

Season standings

Record vs. opponents

Game log

Player statistics

.

Awards and records
Mike Bibby, NBA All-Rookie Team First Team

Transactions
The Grizzlies signed free agent Cherokee Parks, who spent the 1997–98 season with the Minnesota Timberwolves.  Parks averaged 7.1 points in 79 games with Minnesota last season.

The San Antonio Spurs and Grizzlies made a trade, with Vancouver sending Antonio Daniels to the Spurs for Felipe López and Carl Herrera.  Lopez was the Spurs' first round draft pick in the 1998 NBA draft.

References

 Grizzlies on Database Basketball
 Grizzlies on Basketball Reference

Van
Vancouver Grizzlies seasons